Ingenheim is a commune in the Bas-Rhin department in Grand Est in north-eastern France.

The name
The earliest surviving record dates from 739 and names the village Ingenhaim.   The first two syllables may comes from the Germanic given/Christian name, "Ingo".   "Heim" occurs frequently in place names in countries where the local language is or has been a dialect of German:  it is from the same root as the English word "home" and may refer to a grouping of houses or to a farmstead.

History
Between 1802 and 1853 the village was the centre for a consistory for Protestant communities in the surrounding settlements of Dettwiller, Ernolsheim-lès-Saverne, Schwindratzheim, Alteckendorf, Waltenheim-sur-Zorn and Duntzenheim.   It lost out to Schwindratzheim after 1852 when the parish replaced the consistory as the defining organisational unit for protestant churches in France.

Landmarks
The Protestant church, completed in 1911.

See also
 Communes of the Bas-Rhin department

References

Communes of Bas-Rhin
Bas-Rhin communes articles needing translation from French Wikipedia